North Carolina v. Alford, 400 U.S. 25 (1970), was a case in which the Supreme Court of the United States affirmed that there are no constitutional barriers in place to prevent a judge from accepting a guilty plea from a defendant who wants to plead guilty while still protesting his innocence under duress as a detainee status.  This type of plea has become known as an Alford plea, differing slightly from the nolo contendere plea in which the defendant agrees to being sentenced for the crime, but does not admit guilt.  Alford died in prison in 1975.

Case

Trial and appeals
Henry Alford was a black man in the South at the height of the civil rights movement. He had visited a sex worker at a bar and allegedly got into a fight with Nathaniel Young. Young was later killed from a shotgun blast. Henry Alford was indicted for first-degree murder in North Carolina in December 1963.  His attorney, having graduated just a few years previously, interviewed several witnesses and was convinced of Alford's guilt. Despite Alford's claims of innocence and no eyewitness to the crime, witnesses saw him retrieve his gun, shortly before the murder, stated he was going to kill the victim, and then upon returning home, stated that he had carried out the act. Alford also had a lengthy criminal history, including a prior conviction for murder. The attorney believed that Alford would probably be convicted in a trial, and thus recommended Alford plead guilty to the lesser charge of second-degree murder in order to avoid the death penalty. Ultimately, however, the decision  was up to Alford.  Before the plea was entered, the court heard sworn testimony from three witnesses. There were no eyewitnesses to the murder, but witnesses swore that Alford had taken his gun from his house and declared he was going to kill the victim, and upon returning, stated that he had killed the victim.  Alford pleaded guilty to second-degree murder but declared to the court that he was in fact innocent, and was pleading guilty only to avoid the death penalty, which might have been applied had he been convicted of first-degree murder.

The judge sentenced Alford to the maximum second-degree murder penalty of 30 years in prison. Alford appealed on the constitutional ground that his plea was "the product of fear and coercion", in violation of his constitutional rights.  A federal appeals court ruled that the plea was involuntary because it was motivated by fear of the death sentence, and the court should have rejected the guilty plea. The federal appeals court vacated the sentence of the lower court.

Supreme Court ruling

Majority
Justice Byron White wrote that the Court had accepted the case for review because some states authorized conviction only for a crime “where guilt is shown,” including by means of a guilty plea that included an actual admission of guilt; but “others have concluded that they should not ‘force any defense on a defendant in a criminal case,’ particularly when advancement of the defense might ‘end in disaster...’” and therefore would accept a guilty plea in Alford's circumstances.

White wrote that courts may accept whatever plea a defendant chooses to enter, as long as the defendant is competently represented by counsel; the plea is intelligently chosen; and “the record before the judge contains strong evidence of actual guilt.”  Faced with “grim alternatives,” the defendant's best choice of action may be to plead guilty to the crime, White wrote, and the courts must accept the defendant's choice made in his own interests.

Dissent
In the dissent, Justice William Brennan stated that capital punishment in the United States was unconstitutional, and wrote that the actual effect of this unconstitutional threat to Alford was to induce a guilty plea.  He concluded the plea should have been vacated and Alford should have been retried, writing: "the facts set out in the majority opinion demonstrate that Alford was 'so gripped by fear of the death penalty' that his decision to plead guilty was not voluntary but was "the product of duress as much so as choice reflecting physical constraint."

Commentary
Stephanos Bibas (who would be appointed as a federal judge by President Donald Trump in 2017) has spoken out against the Alford plea on the moral ground that it undermines public confidence in the accuracy and fairness of the criminal justice system, sending some people to jail who profess innocence; and that it dodges the "morality play" aspect of a criminal trial, in which the community sees that the guilty are punished.

See also

List of United States Supreme Court cases, volume 400
Brady v. United States, 
Frendak v. United States

References

Further reading

External links

Issue: Effect of Alford Plea of Guilty, Issues In NY Criminal Law, Volume 4, Issue 11.
Transcript Of Plea Form, North Carolina, with question about Alford plea
Court cases
 
US v. Szucko, case cited by United States Court of Appeals for the Fifth Circuit
US v. Bierd, case cited by United States Court of Appeals for the First Circuit

United States Supreme Court cases
United States Supreme Court cases of the Burger Court
United States Fifth Amendment self-incrimination case law
1970 in United States case law
Alford plea